Frihed forpligter (English translation: Duties of Freedom is a 1951 Danish film directed by Alice O'Fredericks and Robert Saaskin.

Cast
 Inger Stender
 Helga Frier
 Lily Broberg
 Sigurd Langberg
 Ib Schønberg
 Johannes Meyer
 Poul Reichhardt
 Karl Gustav Ahlefeldt
 Elga Olga Svendsen
 Mantza Rasmussen
 Aage Foss
 Preben Lerdorff Rye
 Thorkil Lauritzen

External links

1951 films
1950s Danish-language films
Danish black-and-white films
Films directed by Alice O'Fredericks